The Laos national football team is the men's national football team that represents the Lao People's Democratic Republic. It is affiliated with the Asian Football Confederation (AFC) and the regional ASEAN Football Federation (AFF).

History 
Laos established their national football association in 1951. The South East Asian nation is still waiting to make its entrance into a major international competition. Laos have never qualified for the World Cup, Asian Cup or Asian Games and as an international side, their appearances have been restricted to regional tournaments such as the Southeast Asian Games and the AFF Suzuki Cup. After years of internal strife, Laos focused on economic and political recovery. With the country achieving political stability, football has made an impact on Laotians.

Since making their appearance at the 1995 Southeast Asian Games, Laos has competed in the ASEAN Football Championship (formerly known as the Tiger Cup). Although new to the regional tournaments, Laos has displayed passion and talent. In 1995, they beat Brunei and the Philippines and two years later in the Jakarta SEA Games, they also beat Malaysia. Domestic competitions are also active with over 60 clubs competing at various levels. Domestic football is amateur although most of the top teams are drawn from government ministries and public services. In the qualifying preliminary rounds for the 2004 Asian Cup, they beat Bangladesh 2–1. In the Asian zone qualifiers for the 2006 World Cup, they qualified for the second round as a lucky loser after Guam and Nepal both withdrew from the competition, but proceeded to lose all its games (with Qatar, Iran and Jordan). They also advanced to the second round of the Asian qualifiers for the 2014 World Cup, after defeating Cambodia 8–6 on aggregate. In the second round, they lost to China 13–3 on aggregate. Laos has defeated their much more established counterparts such as Brunei, Cambodia, Philippines, Singapore and Malaysia. Laos' first appearance in a continental tournament was in 2014, when they played at the 2014 Challenge Cup.

In 2017, the AFC announced it had been investigating the Laos national team, as well as football club Lao Toyota FC, since 2014 on suspicions of match fixing. As a result, many players and officials were banned for life, 15 of which were banned all at once. The players receiving the bans included star players Khampheng Sayavutthi and Maitee Hatsady, goalkeeper Vathana Keodouangdeth and former captain Saynakhonevieng Phommapanya.

Results and fixtures 
The following is a list of match results in the last 12 months, as well as any future matches that have been scheduled.

2022

2023

Coaching staff

Coaching history

Players

Current squad
The following players were selected for the for the friendly matches against Nepal and Bhutan on 22 and 25 March 2023.

Recent call-ups
The following players have also been called up to the Laos squad within the last twelve months.

Records

Players in bold are still active with Laos.

Most appearances

Top goalscorers

Competition records

World Cup

Asian Cup

Asian Games

AFC Challenge Cup

AFC Solidarity Cup record

AFF Championship 
This competition was formerly known as the Tiger Cup

Football at the Southeast Asian Games

Head-to-head record
Last match updated was against  on 27 September 2022

Honours 

 AFC Solidarity Cup
 Third place (1): 2016

Kit suppliers

See also

 Laos national football team
 Laos national football team results
 List of Laos international footballers
 Laos national under-23 football team
 Laos national under-21 football team
 Laos national under-20 football team
 Laos national under-17 football team
 Laos national futsal team
 Laos national under-20 futsal team
 Laos national beach soccer team
 Laos women's national football team
 Laos women's national football team results
 List of Laos women's international footballers
 Laos women's national under-20 football team
 Laos women's national under-17 football team

References

External links 

 Laos at FIFA.com
 Laos Football Fanclub
 Lao Football's Forum
 Laos 2012/13  at FIFA.com

 
Asian national association football teams